Cheilopora is a genus of bryozoans belonging to the family Cheiloporinidae.

The genus has almost cosmopolitan distribution.

Species:

Cheilopora elfa 
Cheilopora grandis 
Cheilopora inermis 
Cheilopora labiosa 
Cheilopora peristomata 
Cheilopora praelonga 
Cheilopora praelucida 
Cheilopora rhodanica 
Cheilopora sincera

References

Bryozoan genera